Electronic funds transfer (EFT) is the electronic transfer of money from one bank account to another, either within a single financial institution or across multiple institutions, via computer-based systems, without the direct intervention of bank staff.

According to the United States Electronic Fund Transfer Act of 1978 it is "a funds transfer initiated through an electronic terminal, telephone, computer (including on-line banking) or magnetic tape for the purpose of ordering, instructing, or authorizing a financial institution to debit or credit a consumer's account".

EFT transactions are known by a number of names across countries and different payment systems.  For example, in the United States, they may be referred to as "electronic checks" or "e-checks". In the United Kingdom, the term "BACS Payment", "bank transfer" and "bank payment" are used, in Canada, "e-transfer" is used, while in several other European countries "giro transfer" is the common term.

Types 
EFTs include, but are not limited to:
 Automated teller machine (ATM) transfers
 Direct deposit payment or withdrawals of funds initiated by the payer
 Direct debit payments in which a business debits the consumer's bank accounts for payment for goods or services
 Transfers initiated by telephone
 Transfers resulting from credit or debit card transactions, whether initiated through a payment terminal
 Wire transfer via an international banking network such as SWIFT
 Electronic bill payment in online banking, which may be delivered by EFT or paper check
 Instant payment

See also
 Automated Clearing House (ACH)  
 E-commerce payment system
 Electronic funds transfer at point of sale (EFTPOS)
 Immediate Payment Service
 Interbank network
 Payment system
 Real time gross settlement
 Society for Worldwide Interbank Financial Telecommunication (SWIFT)
 Instant payment

References

External links 
 Electronic Funds Transfer Association